Herschel Vespasian Johnson (May 3, 1894 – April 16, 1966) was a U.S. diplomat from North Carolina.  He was the great grandson of Governor Herschel Vespasian Johnson.  He served as a U.S. Foreign Service Officer from 1921 to 1953, and his career included posts in Europe, Latin America, and the United Nations.

He served as Envoy Extraordinary and Minister Plenipotentiary to Sweden between 12 December 1941 and 28 April 1946. Thereafter, he served as the acting US ambassador to the United Nations between 1946 and 1947. In 1948, he was appointed Ambassador Extraordinary and Plenipotentiary to Brazil.

During his time in Sweden, he made humanitarian efforts to save civilian lives and was in touch with Raoul Wallenberg.

He was a vocal proponent of the 1947 Palestine Partition Plan. The outcome of the UN vote is attributed to his collaboration with Andrei A. Gromyko, otherwise Johnson's political opponent. They both stood together on this issue and urged the General Assembly not to delay its decision but to vote for partition at once, opposing last-minute efforts of Arab delegations to effect a compromise.

References

External links
Documents from the WW II era

|-

|-

1894 births
1966 deaths
Ambassadors of the United States to Sweden
American people of World War II
Permanent Representatives of the United States to the United Nations
Raoul Wallenberg
United States Foreign Service personnel
University of North Carolina at Chapel Hill alumni
Harvard Law School alumni
Ambassadors of the United States to Brazil